Appendix cancer are very rare cancers of the vermiform appendix.

Gastrointestinal stromal tumors are rare tumors with malignant potential. Primary lymphomas can occur in the appendix. Breast cancer, colon cancer, and tumors of the female genital tract may metastasize to the appendix.

Diagnosis

Carcinoid tumors are the most common tumors of the appendix. Other common forms are mucinous adenocarcinomas, adenocarcinoma not otherwise specified (NOS), and signet ring cell adenocarcinoma listed from highest to lowest incidence.

Carcinoid

A carcinoid is a neuroendocrine tumor (NET) of the intestines. Incidence rates among carcinoids occur at about .15 per 100,000 per year. This subgroup makes up a large amount of neoplasias both malignant and benign. Almost 3 out of 4 of these tumors are associated with the region at the end of the appendix, and tend to be diagnosed in the 4th to 5th decades in life. Both women and Caucasian individuals show a minor prevalence regarding Neuroendocrine tumor diagnosis without an explanation. Prognosis of 5 year survival rates of carcinoids averages between 70 and 80% for typical cases. Advanced cases for 5 year survival range from 12 to 28%.

Mucinous neoplasm

Mucinous cystadenoma is an obsolete term for appendiceal mucinous neoplasm.

Treatment
Small carcinoids (<2 cm) without features of malignancy may be treated by appendectomy if complete removal is possible. Other carcinoids and adenocarcinomas may require right hemicolectomy. Note: the term "carcinoids" is outdated: these tumors are now more accurately called "neuroendocrine tumors."

Pseudomyxoma peritonei treatment includes cytoreductive surgery which includes the removal of visible tumor and affected essential organs within the abdomen and pelvis. The peritoneal cavity is infused with heated chemotherapy known as HIPEC in an attempt to eradicate residual disease. The surgery may or may not be preceded or followed with intravenous chemotherapy or HIPEC.

Epidemiology
A study of primary malignancies in the United States found a rate of 0.12 cases per 1,000,000 population per year. Carcinoids that were not identified as malignant were not included in this data. Carcinoid is found in roughly 1 in 300-400 appendectomies for acute appendicitis.

In a systematic literature review where 4765 appendiceal cancer patients were identified, the incidence of appendiceal cancer was shown to have increased regardless of the type of tumor, age, sex, and stage of appendiceal cancer. Roughly 75% of appendiceal cases listed in the review had some form of metastases occurring. No observed trends have been noticed as to why this increase is occurring. One theory proposed is the increased use of computed tomography imaging in emergency departments since the early 1990s allowing for detection to occur before a surgery may be performed.

Notable cases
Actress Audrey Hepburn was diagnosed with appendiceal cancer, and died of the disease in 1993. In 2007, ESPN sportscast anchor Stuart Scott was diagnosed with appendiceal cancer, and died of the disease in 2015. Serbian musician Vlada Divljan was diagnosed with the cancer in 2012, and died of subsequent complications in 2015.

References

Further reading

External links 

 Cancer.Net: Appendix Cancer

Gastrointestinal cancer